Giovana Perpétuo dos Santos Floriano (born 30 January 1987), simply known as Giovana, is a Brazilian footballer who plays as a right back or a midfielder for Santos.

Club career
Born in Catanduva, São Paulo, Giovana started her career with hometown club Catanduva FC, spending two years before moving to São José do Rio Preto. She represented América-SP and Rio Preto in the city, aside from a period at Francana, before moving to Austria in 2011, with SV Neulengbach.

Giovana left the Austrian side in May 2013, and returned to Rio Preto in her home 
country. In 2015, after a very short period at São Paulo, she joined Santos.

Ahead of the 2019 season, Giovana returned to São Paulo. She renewed her contract with the club for a further year on 29 December 2019, and signed a new two-year deal in January 2021.

On 14 March 2022, Giovana played her 100th match for Tricolor, a 3–1 win over Real Brasília. On 10 January of the following year, she was announced back at Santos.

Honours
SV Neulengbach
ÖFB-Frauenliga: 2011–12, 2012–13
ÖFB Ladies Cup: 2011–12

Santos
Campeonato Brasileiro de Futebol Feminino Série A1: 2017
Campeonato Paulista de Futebol Feminino: 2018

São Paulo
Campeonato Brasileiro de Futebol Feminino Série A2: 2019

References

1987 births
Living people
Brazilian women's footballers
Women's association football defenders
Women's association football midfielders
SV Neulengbach (women) players
São Paulo FC (women) players
Santos FC (women) players
Brazilian expatriate women's footballers
Brazilian expatriate sportspeople in Austria
Expatriate women's footballers in Austria